Spirit in the Dark is the seventeenth studio album by American singer Aretha Franklin, released on August 24, 1970, by Atlantic Records. It received critical acclaim, but was met with middling sales, despite having two hit singles, "Don't Play That Song (You Lied)", which peaked at #1 R&B, #11 on the Hot 100, and "Spirit in the Dark", peaking at #3 R&B and #23 Hot 100, in Billboard magazine. It was Aretha's first Atlantic album to fall short of Billboard's Top 20, but it is now considered to be one of Aretha's classic Atlantic LPs.

In 1993, Rhino Records re-issued the album on compact disc. "Try Matty's" is used as the jingle for radio host Matt Siegel's Boston Kiss 108 show.

Track listing
Unless otherwise indicated, Information is based on the album's Liner Notes

Personnel
Information is based on the album's Liner Notes
Main
Aretha Franklin – vocals (5, lead on 1–4, 6–12), piano (1-6, 8–12)
Duane Allman – guitar (7)
Margaret Branch – background vocals (1-2, 7–8, 11)
Brenda Bryant – background vocals (1-2, 7–8, 11)
Harold "Hog" Cowart – bass guitar (8-9, 12)
Dave Crawford – organ (8-9, 12)
Cornell Dupree – guitar (8, 11–12)
Buzz Feiten – guitar (1)
Evelyn Green – background vocals (3, 9–10, 12)
Wylene Ivy – background vocals (3, 9–10, 12)
Almeda Lattimore – background vocals (1-3, 9–12)
Pat Lewis – background vocals (3, 9–10, 12)
Ray Lucas – drums (8, 12)
Jimmy O'Rourke – guitar (9)
The Sweet Inspirations – background vocals (4, 6)
Ron "Tubby" Ziegler – drums (9)

The Dixie Flyers
Sammy Creason – drums (1-2, 4, 6, 10)
Jim Dickinson – additional keyboards (1-2, 4, 6, 10)
Charlie Freeman – guitar (1-2, 4, 6, 10)
Tommy McClure – bass guitar (1-2, 4, 6, 10)
Michael Utley – additional keyboards (1-2, 4, 6, 10)

Muscle Shoals Rhythm Section
Barry Beckett – keyboards (7, additional on 3, 5, 11) 
Roger Hawkins – drums (3, 5, 7, 11)
Eddie Hinton – guitar (3, 5, 7, 11)
David Hood – bass guitar (3, 5, 7, 11)
Jimmy Johnson – guitar (3, 5, 7, 11)

Charts

References

1970 albums
Aretha Franklin albums
Albums produced by Tom Dowd
Albums produced by Arif Mardin
Albums produced by Jerry Wexler
Atlantic Records albums
Rhino Records albums